1970 in professional wrestling describes the year's events in the world of professional wrestling.

List of notable promotions 
Only one promotion held notable shows in 1970.

Calendar of notable shows

Championship changes

EMLL

NWA

Births

 Date Unknown 
Robbie Rage
 January 1 – Kimberly Page
 January 4 – Chris Kanyon (d. 2010)
 January 5 - Pamela Paulshock 
 January 10 – Buff Bagwell
 January 14 – Gene Snitsky
 January 15 – Shane McMahon
 January 16 - Rick Bognar (d. 2019)
 January 25 - Carl Malenko 
 February 1 - Mark Frear (d. 2014) 
 February 15 - Mariko Yoshida 
 February 19 - Shark Tsuchiya 
 February 27 - Toshiyo Yamada
 March 6 - Masao Inoue
 March 6 - Tsuyoshi Kosaka 
 March 17 - Katsumi Usuda 
 March 21 - Frank Parker 
 March 23 - Midajah 
 March 24 – Christopher Daniels
 April 7 – Rosey (d. 2017) 
 April 9 - Super Shisa 
 April 13 – Monty Brown
 April 22 – Electroshock
 April 21 - Soulman Alex G 
 April 25 - Chubby Dudley 
 April 26 - Ron Reis 
 May 1 - Jack Bull 
 May 6 - Corey Maclin (d. 2013) 
 May 20 – Cassandro
 May 21 - The Hungarian Barbarian 
 May 29 - Pete Gas 
 May 31 - Takashi Sugiura
 June 1 - Ian Rotten
 June 18 - Kenny Kaos 
 June 21 - Snot Dudley 
 June 26 - Lady Apache
 July 2 - Amy Weber 
 July 3 - Doc Dean (d. 2018) 
 July 4 - Rico Suave
 July 21 - Shawn Stasiak
 July 23 – Cinthia Moreno
 August 9: 
Wing Kanemura 
Evil Dead 
 August 13 – Spike Dudley
 August 22 - Barry Houston
 September 8 – Lodi
 September 14 - Satoshi Kojima 
 September 25 – Aja Kong
 September 29:
Yoshihiro Tajiri
The Kat 
 October 4 – Heavy Metal
 October 5 - Hiromitsu Kanehara
 October 12 – Rodney Mack
 October 16 – Lenny Lane
 October 16 - Kazuyuki Fujita
 October 20 :
Chavo Guerrero Jr.
Tiger Mask IV 
 October 22 – D'Lo Brown
 October 23 - Tony Kozina
 November 2 - Sharmell 
 November 3 – Dawn Marie Psaltis
 November 6 - Bryant Anderson
 November 9 – Chris Jericho
 November 12 - Elektra 
 November 22 - Joe Son 
 December 4 – Sylvester Terkay
 December 7 - Veneno 
 December 15 - Bruno Sassi 
 December 18 – Rob Van Dam
 December 23 - Mima Shimoda

Debuts
 January 6 - Dos Caras
 January 29 - Villano III
 April - Greg Valentine
 October - Kevin Sullivan
 October 13 - Akio Sato
 Uncertain debut date 
 Dino Bravo
 Jerry Lawler
 Ken Mantell 
 Don Muraco
 Alexis Smirnoff
 Pak Song 
 Jerry Stubbs

Retirements
 Bette Boucher (1962 – 1970)

Deaths
 March 23 – Skull Murphy, 39
 April 6 – Sam Sheppard, 46
 May 16 – Emile Czaja, 60
 August 20 – Jerry London, 40

References

 
professional wrestling